Hamilton is a census-designated place and unincorporated community in Monroe County, Mississippi.

The third largest titanium dioxide manufacturing operation in the world is located in Hamilton.

Demographics

History
Hamilton was the first county seat of Monroe County. In 1830,  Monroe County was split to form Lowndes County to the south, and the county seat of Monroe County was moved north to Aberdeen.

The original town of Hamilton was located approximately two miles east of its current location. The town likely moved when the Kansas City, Memphis and Birmingham Railroad was built in the late 1880s.

Economy
Tronox operates a titanium dioxide manufacturing facility in Hamilton, producing 225,000 tonnes annually.

Education
Hamilton School, a K-12 school of the Monroe County School District, is located in the town. The school's "Lady Lions" have won softball state champions for the past 2 years, and the "Hamilton Lions Marching Band" have won 2nd and 3rd place at state championships the past 2 years as well.

Notable people
 J. W. Alexander, gospel musician.
Don Smith, professional football player.

References

Unincorporated communities in Monroe County, Mississippi
Unincorporated communities in Mississippi
Census-designated places in Monroe County, Mississippi